Dębno oil field is a Polish oil field that was discovered in 2004. It is one of the biggest on-shore oil field of Poland. It began production in 2005 and produces oil.

References

Energy in Poland
Myślibórz County
Oil fields of Poland